The Village (1993) is a television series about the life and times of the villagers of Bentley, Hampshire, from 1993 to 2001.

It was initially broadcast as a radio programme on BBC Radio 4, Christmas 1990, and continued in 1991, 1992 and 1993 – a total of 50 radio broadcasts. A book was also written by Nigel Farrell, covering the original Radio 4 episodes: The Village: The Early Years.

Due to the success of the radio broadcast, the TV series began filming in summer 1993 and was broadcast on 3 October 1993 by ITV Meridian, later to be shown on BBC 2 and Sky. It was also exported to Australian and Norwegian TV. The series was produced by Paul Sommers for Tiger Aspect Productions. It was directed and narrated by Nigel Farrell. It ran for 102 episodes.

Cast
The Top 10 Cast (in order of appearance)

Episodes 

The date shown is the date first broadcast on Meridian TV. The events in the series had occurred in the previous 6–12 months prior to broadcast.

1993 British television series debuts
2001 British television series endings
Television series by Tiger Aspect Productions